Ellen Churchill Semple (January 8, 1863 – May 8, 1932) was an American geographer and the first female president of the Association of American Geographers. She contributed significantly to the early development of the discipline of geography in the United States, particularly studies of human geography. She is most closely associated with work in anthropogeography and environmentalism, and the debate about "environmental determinism".

Early life
Semple was born in Louisville, Kentucky, the youngest of five children by Alexander Bonner Semple and Emerine Price.

Education
Semple's early education was guided by her mother, Emerine Semple, as well as private tutors. Semple followed her sister, Patty Semple, to Vassar where she graduated as valedictorian and was the youngest member of her graduating class. Semple graduated in 1882 with a BA in History from Vassar College at the age of 19, and continued on at Vassar to earn an MA in History in (1891). She became interested in geography while visiting London, where she encountered the works of Friedrich Ratzel. She went to Germany to seek out Ratzel and study with him at the University of Leipzig. As a woman, she was prohibited from matriculating, but she was able to gain permission to attend Ratzel's lectures, the only woman in a class of five hundred male students. She continued to work with Ratzel and produced several academic papers in American and European journals, but was never conferred a degree.

Career
Semple was the first woman to become president of the Association for American Geographers. Semple was a pioneer in American geography, helping to broaden the discipline's focus beyond physical features of the earth and bringing attention to human aspects of geography. Her innovative approach and theories influenced the development of human geography as a significant subfield and influenced the social sciences across disciplines, including history and anthropology.

Semple taught at the University of Chicago from 1906 to 1920, but her first permanent academic position was offered to her in 1922 at Clark University. She was the first female faculty member, teaching graduate students in geography for the next decade, but her salary was always significantly less than her male colleagues. She also lectured at the University of Oxford in 1912 and 1922.

Her first book, American History and its Geographic Conditions (1903) and her second, Influences of Geographic Environment (1911), were widely-used textbooks for students of geography and history in the United States at the start of the 20th century.

Semple was a founding member of the Association of American Geographers (AAG). She was elected AAG's first female President in 1921, and remains only one of six women to hold that office since the organization's founding in 1904.

Theoretical contributions

Environmental determinism and anthropogeography
 "Man is the product of the earth's surface." 

Semple was a key figure in the theory of environmental determinism, along with Ellsworth Huntington and Griffith Taylor. Influenced by the works of Charles Darwin and inspired by her mentor Freidrich Ratzel, Semple theorized that human activity was primarily determined by the physical environment. Although environmental determinism is today heavily critiqued and has lost favor in social theory, it was widely accepted in academia in the late 19th-early 20th centuries. Still, Semple's influence can be seen in the works of many modern-day geographers, including Jared Diamond.

In a series of books and papers she communicated certain aspects of the work of German geographer Friedrich Ratzel to the Anglophone community. Standard disciplinary accounts often attribute to Semple a prevailing interest in environmental determinism, a theory that the physical environment, rather than social conditions, determines culture; however her later work emphasized environmental influences as opposed to the environment's deterministic effect on culture, reflecting broader academic discontent with environmental determinism after the First World War.

In her work Influences of Geographic Environment on the Basis of Ratzel's System of Anthropo-Geography (1911), she describes people and their associated landscapes, dividing the world into key environmental types. Semple identifies four key ways that the physical environment is affected: 1) direct physical effects (climate, altitude); 2) psychical effects (culture, art, religion); 3) economic and social development (resources and livelihoods); 4) movement of people (natural barriers and routes, such as mountains and rivers).

Semple's work also reflects discussions and conflicts within geography and social theory about determinism and race. Indeed, in some works she challenges popular ideas of her time about race determining social and cultural differences, suggesting that environment was a more important factor in cultural development. Semple's theories of environmental determinism have been criticized as overly simplistic and often replicating the same themes of racial determination through "nature". However, Semple's work has more recently been revisited for its early examination of issues which are now central to political ecology.

Semple believed that mankind originated in the tropics but gained full maturity in the temperate regions of the world."where man has remained in the tropics, with few exceptions, he has suffered arrested development. His nursery has kept him a child."

Fieldwork
Semple conducted fieldwork for her research in Kentucky and the Mediterranean, an innovative practice that was uncommon in geography at the time. From 1911 to 1912, she undertook an eighteen-month journey which visited Japan, Korea, China, the Philippines, Java, Ceylon, India, Egypt, Palestine, Lebanon, and Turkey in addition to places in Europe and the United States. The main focus of the trip was a three-month visit to Japan, facilitated by her Vassar classmate Ōyama Sutematsu, which produced unusually positive depictions of Japan during a period of high anti-Japanese sentiment in the United States. During her fieldwork, she took notes on human-environment relations, cultural features of the landscape, and made detailed observations of housing, structures, livelihoods, and daily life.

Late life
Semple continued to teach geography until her death in 1932. She died in West Palm Beach, Florida, and is buried in the Cave Hill National Cemetery in Louisville.

Awards and recognition
In 1914 Semple received the Cullum Geographic Medal from the American Geographical Society, "in recognition of her distinguished contributions to the science of anthropogeography". She was President of the Association of American Geographers (now the American Association of Geographers) from 1921 to 1922 and was awarded the Helen Culver Gold Medal by the Geographic Society of Chicago, in recognition of her leadership in American Geography.

Semple Elementary School in Semple's hometown of Louisville was named in her honor.

Works

References

Bibliography
 Keighren, Innes M. "Bringing geography to the book: charting the reception of Influences of geographic environment." Transactions of the Institute of British Geographers 31, no. 4 (2006): 525–40.
 Keighren, Innes M. Bringing geography to book: Ellen Semple and the reception of geographical knowledge. London: I.B. Tauris, 2010.
 "Semple, Ellen Churchill."  Notable American Women.  Vol. 2, 4th ed., The Belknap Press of Harvard University Press, 1975 
 worldcat.org Accessed August 27, 2007
 Lewis, Martin W. (February 2011). "Ellen Churchill Semple and Paths Not Taken". GeoCurrents. Accessed 2015-03-12.

External links
 
 

1863 births
1933 deaths
American geographers
Clark University faculty
Geopoliticians
People from Louisville, Kentucky
Vassar College alumni
Recipients of the Cullum Geographical Medal
University of Chicago faculty
Presidents of the American Association of Geographers
Women geographers
19th-century geographers
20th-century geographers
20th-century American scientists
Burials at Cave Hill Cemetery